Taqwacore: The Birth of Punk Islam is a 2009 documentary film, directed by Omar Majeed and produced by EyeSteelFilm, about various Taqwacore bands and performers touring the United States and Pakistan. The documentary was filmed between 2007 and 2009. It was pitched at the 2007 Sheffield Doc/Fest MeetMarket prior to completion.

Appearances
Many individuals are featured in the documentary, including:
Michael Muhammad Knight, author of 2003 novel The Taqwacores about punk Islam where he imagined a community of Muslim radicals: mohawked Sufis, riot grrrls in burqas with band patches, skinhead Shi’as etc. Knight is American convert to Islam who joins the band in their tour. 
The Kominas, a Pakistani punk band from the suburbs of Boston, Massachusetts. Members:
Basim Usmani (bass and vocals)
Shahjehan Khan (guitar and vocals)
Arjun Ray (guitar and vocals)
Imran Malik (drums)
Al-Thawra, heavy metal Arab band from Chicago featuring Marwan  
Diacritical
Vote Hezbollah, fronted by Kourosh, an Iranian from San Antonio
Secret Trial Five an all-female Canadian punk rock band fronted by Sena, a Pakistani lesbian from Vancouver

Synopsis

The Pakistani punks The Kominas have arrived at the last stop of their first American tour and are celebrating with tourmates. Also appearing are the author Michael Muhammad Knight (The Taqwacores), Koroush (Vote Hezbollah), Sena (Secret Trial Five) and Marwan (Al-Thawra).
They incite a riot of young hijabi girls at ISNA, the largest Muslim gathering in North America, after Sena takes the stage.

The film then travels with Knight to Pakistan, where his friends (in a new band named after Noble Drew Ali) bring punk to the streets of Lahore and elsewhere in the region.  Michael also begins to reconcile his fundamentalist past with the rebel he has now become.

Festivals
Vancouver International Film Festival, world premiere
Festival du Nouveau Cinéma, Montreal, Quebec premiere
Sheffield Doc/Fest, European premiere
Theatrical release October 19, 2009
 Festival International du Film Indépendant, Lille, France, winner of the Silver Butterfly prize, 2011

References

External links

EyeSteelFilm page on Taqwacore
Taqwacore Webzine

2009 films
EyeSteelFilm films
Canadian documentary films
Taqwacore
Documentary films about punk music and musicians
2009 documentary films
2009 directorial debut films
2000s English-language films
2000s Canadian films